Oleg Nikolayevich Karavayev (20 May 1936 – 23 August 1978) was a Soviet bantamweight Greco-Roman wrestler. He won the world title in 1958 and 1961 and an Olympic gold medal in 1960.

He was Jewish. Karavayev took up wrestling aged 16 and quickly became one of the most technically gifted Soviet wrestlers. Between 1956 and 1962 he rarely lost a bout, and won the Soviet title every year except for 1961. In 1964 he failed to qualify for the Tokyo Olympics, and retired to become a wrestling coach, heading the Belorussian team through the late 1960s. From 1971 until his death he worked at his native sports society Burevestnik. The Illness in 1978 led to his death at the age 42. Since 1992, an annual wrestling tournament has been held in his honor in his native Minsk.

See also
List of select Jewish wrestlers

References

External links

1936 births
1978 deaths
Sportspeople from Minsk
Soviet male sport wrestlers
Olympic wrestlers of the Soviet Union
Wrestlers at the 1960 Summer Olympics
Belarusian male sport wrestlers
Olympic gold medalists for the Soviet Union
Olympic medalists in wrestling
Medalists at the 1960 Summer Olympics
World Wrestling Championships medalists
Burevestnik (sports society) athletes
Jewish Belarusian sportspeople
Soviet Jews
Jewish wrestlers

Honoured Masters of Sport of the USSR
Recipients of the Order of the Red Banner of Labour